The hard white wheat incentive payments are payments authorized by the Farm Security and Rural Investment Act passed by the United States Congress in 2002 (P.L. 101-171, Sec. 1616) to encourage the production of hard white wheat. This wheat largely is produced by Australia.

References 

United States Department of Agriculture
Agricultural subsidies